Miaenia hirashimai is a species of beetle in the family Cerambycidae. It was described by Samuelson in 1965.

References

Miaenia
Beetles described in 1965